"Yes He Can" is a song performed by American Christian country band Cain. The song impacted Christian radio in the United States on April 17, 2020, as the second single from their debut studio album, Rise Up (2021). The song was written by Jeff Pardo, Logan Cain, Madison Cain, Nick Schwarz, and Taylor Cain. Jeff Pardo produced the single.

"Yes He Can" peaked at No. 5 on the US Hot Christian Songs chart.

Background
On March 20, 2021, the radio team of Provident Label Group announced that "Yes He Can" will be serviced to Christian radio in the United States, the official add date for the single slated on April 16, 2021. Taylor Cain shared the story behind the song, saying:

Composition

Music videos
The official audio video of "Yes He Can" was published on Cain's YouTube channel on March 6, 2020. The Song Session video of the song was availed by Essential Worship on March 25, 2020, to YouTube. The official music video for "Yes He Can" was availed by Cain on April 2, 2021, to YouTube. The official acoustic performance video of the song was published by Cain on YouTube on April 23, 2021.

Charts

Weekly charts

Year-end charts

Release history

References

External links
 
 

2020 songs
2021 singles